Crowell may refer to:

People

Surname
 A. Elmer Crowell, American decoy carver
 Andrew Crowell, Australian rules footballer
 Angelo Crowell, American football player
 Benedict Crowell, United States Assistant Secretary of War
 Bob Crowell, American lawyer and politician
 Clarisa Crowell, American softball coach
 Germane Crowell, American football player
 Isaiah Crowell, American football player
 James Burns Crowell, founder of J. B. Crowell and Son Brick Mould Mill Complex
 Jason Glennon Crowell, American politician in Missouri
 Jesse Crowell, American pioneer settler in Michigan
 John Crowell (Alabama politician), American politician
 John Crowell (Ohio politician), American politician
 John Franklin Crowell, American educator and president of Duke University
 John S. Crowell, founder of Crowell-Collier Publishing Company
 Josephine Crowell, Canadian actress
 Matt Crowell, Welsh footballer
 Orestes A. Crowell, American politician in Wisconsin
 Rodney Crowell, American singer/songwriter
 Samuel Crowell, American ship-captain and fur trader
 Thomas Y. Crowell, American bookbinder and father of T. Irving Crowell
Thomas Y. Crowell Co., American publishing company founded by Crowell
 T. Irving Crowell, American publisher and son of Thomas Y. Crowell

Forename
 Crowell Willson (1815–1894), Canadian politician
 Crowell Willson (Upper Canada) (1762–1832), American-born politician in British Canada

Fictional characters
Jolene Crowell, General Hospital
Nadine Crowell, General Hospital

Places

United Kingdom
 Crowell, Oxfordshire

United States
 Crowell, Nebraska
 Crowell, Texas
 Warren-Crowell House, a historic house in Terrell, Texas

See also
 Crowe (disambiguation)

English-language surnames